Prof. Joshua Shemer chairs the Assuta Medical Centers network in Israel, currently building and developing the new advanced highly sophisticated public hospital in the city of Ashdod, the first of its kind built in Israel in the past forty years. He formerly served as Director General of Maccabi Healthcare Services, providing health services to 24% of the Israeli population. Shemer served as director general of the Ministry of Health and Surgeon General of the Israel Defense Forces Military Health Corps, holding the rank of brigadier general.

Biography 
Shemer was born in Israel and received his medical degree from The Hebrew University Hadassah Medical School in Jerusalem. He is a Full professor of Internal medicine at Tel Aviv University and is Board-certified in both internal medicine and health administration.

Shemer was recruited to the Israeli Defense Forces in 1966. In 1972 he began his residency at the Soroka Medical Center. During the Yom Kippur War in 1973, he performed his first field operation – on an Egyptian soldier on the West Bank of the Suez Canal. He later served as Battalion and Brigade Doctor. He was promoted to Chief Medical Officer of the Northern Command at the time of the Israeli deployment in south Lebanon. Following his experience as head of the branch of the medical corps on biological and chemical warfare and his promotion to the role of Deputy Surgeon General during the Gulf War, Shemer was responsible for the development of the passive hood distributed to protect the Israeli population during chemical warfare.

Professional career 
In 1992 Shemer founded the Israeli Center for technology assessment in Health Care at the Gertner Institute for Epidemiology and Health Policy Research at Tel HaShomer and continues to serve as the Center's Director.

He was Director of the School of Public health at the Sackler Faculty of Medicine at Tel Aviv University, lecturer at the Faculty of Administration and head of the MBA Multi-disciplinary Program for Emergency and Disaster Management at the Sackler Faculty of Medicine, Tel Aviv, University. Shemer initiated BA studies at the School for health professions at the Center for Academic Studies in Or Yehuda and currently lectures on HTA in this program.

Other activities 
For the past nine years Shemer has been a member of the board of directors of El Al Airlines, He also was the founder and Head of Administration for Medical Technology and Infrastructure at the Israeli Ministry of Health.

Books edited 
 Shemer J, Shoenfeld Y. Terror and Medicine. Pabst Science Publishers, Lengerich, Germany, 2003 ((USA)). 
 Shemer J, Barel V. Injury in Israel. The Hebrew University Magnes Press, Jerusalem, 2002.
 Chinitz D, Cohen J, Co-editors: Shamai N, Shemer J, Siebzheiner M.
 Governments and Health Systems – Implications of Differing Involvements.
 John Wiley & Sons Ltd. Chichester, 1998.
 Shemer J, Schersten T. Technology Assessment in Health Care: from theory to practice. Gefen Publishing House Ltd, Jerusalem 1995.
 Shemer J, Vienonen M. Reforming Health Care Systems. Gefen Publishing House Ltd, Jerusalem 1995.
 Danon Y, Shemer J. Clinical Warfare Medicine – Aspects and Perspectives from Persian Gulf War. Gefen Publishing House Ltd, Jerusalem 1994.

References

Living people
The Hebrew University-Hadassah Medical School alumni
Israeli generals
Israeli military doctors
Academic staff of Tel Aviv University
Year of birth missing (living people)